Stranger Than Fiction is the tenth mixtape by the American rapper Kevin Gates. It was published on July 16, 2013. The release peaked at number 37 on the US Billboard 200, selling 8,000 copies in the first week. The album was a contractual obligation with Breadwinners Records, after Gates had signed with Atlantic Records earlier in the year.

The track "Thinking with My Dick", featuring Juicy J, was re-released as a single in March 2022, debuting at and reaching number 37 on the Billboard Hot 100 chart on the week ending March 26, 2022. Subsequently, EDM remixes from Lovra and Ten Tonne Skeleton were released.

Track listing

Mixtape release

References

2013 albums
Kevin Gates albums